The Hedges is a historic home and Adirondack Great Camp located at Blue Mountain Lake in Hamilton County, New York.  The property consists of 30 buildings and structures and many related site features.  From about 1890 to 1920, it was the seasonal home of Hiram B. Duryea, and from this period nine buildings and structures remain.  In 1920, it was purchased by Richard J. Collins and converted to an Adirondack resort.  The Main Lodge complex was built in 1882; the main block is a two-story, wood-framed building with a mansard roof. The Stone Lodge was built 1900–03 and is a two-story gambrel-roofed building.

It was added to the National Register of Historic Places in 2009.

In April 2018, the Hedges was sold to a coalition of sixty individuals and families, many of whom had a long history as guests at the resort.  It remains open to the public.

Gallery

References

External links
The Hedges website

Adirondack Great Camps
Houses on the National Register of Historic Places in New York (state)
Houses in Hamilton County, New York
National Register of Historic Places in Hamilton County, New York